Overhang seats are constituency seats won in an election under the traditional mixed member proportional (MMP) system (as it originated in Germany), when a party's share of the nationwide votes would entitle it to fewer seats than the number of individual constituencies won. The electoral reform in Germany removed the overhang seats, and replaced with Zweitstimmendeckung.

How overhang seats arise 
Under MMP, a party is entitled to a number of seats based on its share of the total vote. If a party's share entitles it to ten seats and its candidates win seven constituencies, it will be awarded three list seats, bringing it up to its required number. This only works, however, if the party's seat entitlement is not less than the number of constituencies it has won. If, for example, a party is entitled to five seats, but wins six constituencies, the sixth constituency seat is referred to as an overhang seat. Overhang can result from an unproportional distribution of constituencies as well as strong region-based support or the existence of regional parties.

Earning overhang seats 
The two mechanisms that together increase the number of overhang seats are:
 winning many constituencies;
 decreasing the number of party votes and therefore the number of seats to which the party is proportionally entitled.

In many countries, overhang seats are rare – a party that is able to win constituency seats is generally able to win a significant portion of the party vote as well. There are, however, some circumstances in which overhang seats may arise relatively easily:

Few major parties, large number of minor parties – When there are only one or two major parties, but a relatively large number of minor parties that, combined, achieve a significant share of the total proportional vote, but fail to elect any constituency seats, the large parties often end up with overhang seats.
 Similar lead across constituencies – If one party wins all or most constituencies of a relevant area with a rather low margin, it would be more prone to overhang mandates than if different parties lead in different constituencies, with the same overall share of each of the parties. As such, if there is less difference between constituencies, overhang seats are more probable.
A large number of constituencies compared with the total number of seats – If too many seats are used for constituencies, the remainder are less likely to ensure strict proportionality.
Unevenly sized constituencies – Candidates that win small constituencies by a narrow margin do not generate enough votes to justify their full seats under a proportional system.
Low turnout in some constituencies – This has the same effect as small constituencies. Furthermore, turnout and party preferences may be highly correlated, e.g. rural vs. urban areas.
Small number of seats to be allocated – The higher the absolute number of constituencies, the more likely it is that different reasons for overhang seats will balance out between parties. E.g., after the German federal Bundestag election in 2013, the main reason for overhang seats was that some compensation happens for party's state lists instead of at the federal level only.
Individual candidates with strong local followings – Sometimes, a particular politician will have strong support in their own constituency, but will belong to a party with very low support, even in their own area. The candidate will be elected based on their own qualities, but the party they belong to will not receive enough votes to justify the candidate's seat. In the case of independent candidates, this is usually guaranteed – they have no party at all, and so obviously cannot win votes under MMP's party-list proportional representation. However, some countries, such as New Zealand, have special rules dealing with independents – seats won by these candidates are exempted from the proportional system altogether.
Regional parties – Parties based in a particular region may win a substantial number of constituency seats in that region without necessarily gaining a large share of the national vote. Parties focused on particular ethnic or religious minorities may also come under this category, particularly if seats are reserved for these groups.
Tactical voting – Voters in countries that can cast a vote in the list vote and cast a local vote (such as Germany) may decide not to vote for a local candidate that has little chance of winning but still support that party on the list vote. Parties that win many local seats but attract a reduced list vote may receive an overhang as a result.
Decoy parties – Party labels in the constituencies can be deliberately mismatched with those in the proportional vote in an attempt to induce tactical voting.  In Italy in 2001, two lists won a significant majority of the total number of first-past-the post seats, despite winning almost none of the proportional vote. The system, nicknamed scorporo, was not a type of additional member system in which overhangs could occur, it resulted in a significant distortion to the desired compensatory nature.

Dealing with overhang seats
Overhang seats are dealt with in different ways by different systems.

Take the number of additional list seats off from the other parties' proportional entitlement
A party is allowed to keep any overhang seats it wins, and the corresponding number of list seats allocated to other parties is eliminated to maintain the number of assembly seats. This means that a party with overhang seats has more seats than its entitlement, and other parties have fewer. This approach is used in the Chamber of Deputies of Bolivia and the National Assembly of Lesotho. It was unsuccessfully recommended by the 2006 Ontario Citizens' Assembly on Electoral Reform for adoption by the Legislative Assembly of Ontario, and the proposed Dual-member proportional representation system uses this approach as well. While for the first additional list seats are simply denied to parties, in the latter three cases, a fairer procedure was proposed of subtracting the constituency seats won by parties with overhang seats from the total number of seats and recalculating the quota (the largest remainder method was also recommended) to proportionally redistribute the list seats to the other parties.

In the Scottish Parliament, Welsh Senedd and London Assembly, the effect is similar, but the mechanism different.  In the allocation of second vote list seats using a highest averages method, the first vote constituency seats already won are taken into account when calculating party averages, with the aim of making the overall result proportional.  If a party wins more seats in the first vote than its proportion of second votes would suggest it should win overall, or if an independent candidate wins a constituency seat, then the automatic effect is to reduce the overall number of seats won by other parties below what they might expect proportionally.

Allow the overhang
A party is allowed to keep any overhang seats it wins, but other parties are still awarded the same number of seats that they are entitled to. This means that a party with overhang seats has more seats than its entitlement. The New Zealand Parliament uses this system; one extra seat was added in the 2005 election and 2011 election, and two extra seats in the 2008 election. This system was also used in the German Bundestag until 2013, when Germany switched to a fully compensatory system.

Compensating the overhang 
Other parties may be given additional list seats (sometimes called "balance seats" or leveling seats) lest they be disadvantaged. This preserves the same ratio between parties as was established in the election. It also increases the size of the legislature, as overhang seats are added, and there may also be extra list seats added to counteract them. This system results is less proportional than full compensation, as the party with the overhang is still receiving a "bonus" above its proportional entitlement. After the Federal Constitutional Court of Germany ruled in 2008 that the established implementation of Option 1 was unconstitutional (because in rare instances, it allowed votes to negatively affect the number of seats for a given party, contradicting the voter's will - see below), full compensation of overhang seats is applied as of 2013 in the German Bundestag by providing for the first time for the creation of balancing seats. However, as the implementation of the system to equalize overhang seats led to a drastic increase of the size of the Bundestag, there have been ongoing reform efforts ever since.

Non-awarding of overhang seats
A party is not allowed to keep any overhang seats it wins, with its number of seats actually being reduced until it fits the party's entitlement. This method raises the question of which constituency seats the party is not allowed to keep.  After that is determined, it would then have to be decided who, if any, will represent these constituencies. This was used in the Landtag of Bavaria until 1966, with the candidates with the lowest number of votes not keeping the constituency seat. The Bavarian system allows for this more easily as both the first and second vote are "personalized" as they are both given to individual candidates who represent their party, the first vote going to a candidate standing in that District while the second is given to an individual candidate standing in the same region excluding those candidates standing in the same district. Unlike for federal and most other German state elections, in Bavarian state elections, the number of seats allocated in the Landtag is based on the combined share of both the first and second votes. Which individual candidates are entitled to the seats their party is allocated is again calculated based on the number of votes they received and not on their position on a predetermined closed list (as in federal elections). This is similar to panachage, a system used for local elections in Bavaria, that allows voters to alter the order of candidates on party lists with their general election vote.  As a consequence of this system in the 1954 Bavarian state election two overhang seats were not awarded.

Constitutionality 
Prior to German reunification overhang mandates - particularly at the federal level - were relatively rare and never amounted to more than five (out of over 400 total seats) in any given Bundestag and several federal elections resulted in no overhang at all. This was in part due to the relative strength of the two "Volksparteien" CDU/CSU and SPD which combined to over 60% and sometimes over 80% of the federal vote and as only half as many constituencies as seats exist, it was unlikely for a party to win more than a handful more constituencies in any given state than their vote-share would have given them in list seats.

However, this began to change as East Germany started participating in German federal elections starting with the 1990 German federal election. As the election results notably differ in East and West Particularly as the PDS (later fused and renamed to Die Linke) achieved far better election results in the East where it approached "Volkspartei" status. Thus constituencies which had previously been won by absolute majorities or at least a large plurality could now be won by slimmer pluralities than in previous elections. For example, the SPD while sweeping all 6 constituencies in Mecklenburg Vorpommern in the 2021 German federal elections achieved "only" 29,1% of the statewide :de:Zweitstimmen. In the 1994 German federal election the re-elected Kohl government supported by a "black-yellow" coalition (CDU/CSU and FDP) achieved a relatively slim majority of 341 out of 672 seats to the opposition's (SPD, Alliance 90/The Greens, PDS) 331 seats at the opening session. This majority would've been even narrower if not for twelve overhang mandates the CDU/CSU had achieved, which were however partially mitigated by the four overhang mandates for the opposition SPD. This led to much more public debate on the existence of overhang mandates and what to do about them. There was even a challenge of the validity of the election result based on the overhang seat issue raised by a private citizen after the 1994 election, which was however dismissed as "obviously without merit" (“offensichtlich unbegründet“) 

The problem thus turning from a theoretical consideration to a real issue, the German Constitutional Court as early as 1997 ruled that a "substantial number" of overhang mandates which weren't equalized through leveling seats were unconstitutional. The issue became more pressing as negative vote weight was introduced as a phenomenon to a broader public due to the 2005 German federal election in the constituency Dresden I having to be held later than the election in the other 298 constituencies after a candidate in the constituency died days ahead of the election date. Der Spiegel published an article between the main election and the makeup election in Dresden I lining out how more votes for the CDU could lead to them losing a seat in the Bundestag overall. The anticipated tactical voting in Dresden I does indeed seem to have occurred as Andreas Lämmel (CDU) won the constituency with roughly 37% of the :de:Erststimme (~ constituency vote) while his party won only 24.4% of the :de:Zweitstimmen (~ list vote) in the constituency, with the center-right FDP receiving 16.6% - more than one and a half times their federal vote share of 9.8%

This led to another ruling by the German Constitutional Court in 2008 which ruled that the existing federal electoral law was unconstitutional in part as it violated the principle of one person one vote and produced an overly opaque relationship between the numbers of votes cast and seats in parliament. However, the Court also allowed for a three year deadline to change the electoral law, allowing for the 2009 German federal election to be held under the previous set of rules.

The electoral reform passed with the votes of the governing "black-yellow" coalition in late 2011 (a few weeks after the deadline set in 2008) - and without consulting the opposition parties - was again ruled unconstitutional by the Constitutional Court. Furthermore, the Court clarified that the federal electoral system was supposed to be primarily one of proportional representation and a number of non-compensated overhang mandates above 15 would "dilute" this proportional character.

As the Bundestag thus lacked a constitutional electoral mechanism and the 2013 German federal election was coming up, the government agreed to negotiations with the opposition parties, leading to a new electoral law being passed in early 2013 with broad support from all parties in the Bundestag except Die Linke who voted against the reform due to concerns regarding a possible massive increase in the size of the Bundestag due to overhang and leveling seats

On the state level an unclear wording in the state electoral law of Schleswig-Holstein led to different possible assignments of leveling seats to equalize the overhang seats ultimately resulting in the 2009 Schleswig-Holstein state election giving a majority of seats to the Peter Harry Carstensen led "black-yellow" coalition, despite them having won a lower share of the vote than the SPD, Greens, Left, SSW opposition. Following a suit before the State Constitutional Court brought by opposition parties, it was ruled that the electoral law in its then current interpretation did indeed violate the state constitution but that the Landtag was to keep its composition until a new electoral law could be passed (which happened in 2011) after which new elections would be scheduled with enough time for campaigns setting the next election for 2012, two years earlier than if the Landtag had served its full five year term.

Debates about yet another electoral reform soon resurfaced as the Bundestag did indeed grow in size due to the 2013 electoral reform - it had had 622 members after the 2009 election, 631 after the 2013 but swelled to 709 members after the 2017 election. As a result of the 2021 election producing yet more additional members of the Bundestag, 735 seats will have to be fit into the Reichstag building to accommodate all members of the 20th Bundestag. Measures to reduce the size of the Bundestag (caused, in no small part, by overhang mandates and the measures taken to equalize them) were debated during the 19th Bundestag.

Examples

Germany 
In state and federal elections in Germany, every constituency seat is granted while the electoral system requires that a party needs 5% of the party-list vote to win list seats. Unless in federal elections a party wins at least three constituency seats, it is excluded by (i.e., due to) the election threshold. In 1994 the PDS fell below the 5% threshold but still got its share of list seats as it had won enough constituency seats, and the same happened in 2021 for Die Linke. But in 2002 the PDS won only two constituencies and was excluded from the list seats resulting in two overhang seats. The PDS had won four seats in Berlin at the 1998 election (in addition to surpassing the electoral threshold at 5.1% of the second vote) but - partly due to redistricting, which changed the boundaries of constituencies the PDS had won in 1998, lost two of their constituency seats, including placing third behind Hans-Christian Ströbele in the newly created Berlin-Friedrichshain-Kreuzberg – Prenzlauer Berg East constituency.

In the 2021 federal election, The Left fell just short of the election threshold with 4.9% of the national vote but won three single-member constituency seats; Berlin-Lichtenberg, Berlin-Treptow-Köpenick and Leipzig II. This entitled them to proportional representation in the Bundestag according to their second votes. The extra compensation seats for other parties meant that the Bundestag would be the largest in German history, with 736 MPs.

New Zealand 
In New Zealand, the Māori Party usually gets less than 5% of the party votes; the threshold required to enter parliament - unless the party wins an electorate seat.  The Māori Party won one overhang seat in 2005 and 2011, and two overhang seats in 2008. In 2005 their share of the party vote was under 2% on the initial election night count, but was 2.12% in the final count which included special votes cast outside the electorate. On election night it appeared that the party, whose candidates had won four electorate seats, would get two overhang seats in Parliament. However, with their party vote above 2% the party got an extra seat and hence needed only one overhang seat. National got one less list seat in the final count, so then conceded defeat (the result was close between the two largest parties, National and Labour).

See also

 Underhang seat

Notes

References

 

Party-list proportional representation
Elections in Germany
Elections in New Zealand

sco:Addeetional Member Seestem#Owerhang saets